Polemonium vanbruntiae is a species of flowering plant in the phlox family known by the common names Appalachian Jacob's ladder and Vanbrunt's polemonium. It is native to eastern Canada and the northeastern United States.

This perennial herb grows erect from a horizontal rhizome, reaching one meter in maximum height. The leaves are each made up of 7 to 10 pairs of lance-shaped or nearly oval leaflets. The inflorescence is a corymb of purple-blue flowers with yellow centers. The stamens and style protrude from the bell-shaped corolla. This species is similar to Polemonium caeruleum and P. reptans. The plant reproduces sexually and vegetatively, by resprouting from the rhizome, forming large clumps of clones. Flowering occurs in June and July.

This species can be found from New Brunswick and Quebec south to Maryland. It is not common anywhere but it is probably most abundant in New York.

This species grows in wetlands, such as swamps, bogs, marshes, and wet spots on roadsides. It can tolerate a wide variety of wetland habitat types. The habitat is often saturated, but not flooded.

The main threat to the species is the destruction and degradation of wetland habitat, for example, by flooding during dam construction. Habitat is also lost outright in the conversion to agriculture and other uses. Succession may be a threat in some areas, as the plant's open habitat becomes shaded when large and woody vegetation moves in. It is adapted to some level of disturbance in the habitat.

This plant is sometimes cultivated for garden use.

References

External links
Understanding and Conserving Appalachian Jacob's-Ladder. USFS.
Maine Natural Areas Program

vanbruntiae
Flora of North America